Fimple is a surname. Notable people with the surname include:

Dennis Fimple (1940–2002), American actor
Jack Fimple (born 1959), American baseball player